Al-Riyadh Sport Club, is an Iraqi football team based in Hawija District, Kirkuk, that plays in the Iraq Division Three.

Managerial history
 Qahtan Yassin

See also 
 2020–21 Iraq FA Cup
 2021–22 Iraq FA Cup

References

External links
 Al-Riyadh SC on Goalzz.com
 Iraq Clubs- Foundation Dates

2019 establishments in Iraq
Association football clubs established in 2019
Football clubs in Kirkuk